is a Japanese manga series written and illustrated by Masami Kurumada. It was published in Weekly Shōnen Jump from January 1982 to November 1983. It tells the story of sword legends and rivalry between ninja clans. The main character Kojiro is a young boy who is a member of the Fuma clan.

The series was adapted into an original video animation (OVA) series released between June 1989 and December 1990, plus an additional episode released in November 1992.

A sequel entitled , written and illustrated by Satoshi Yuri, was published in Akita Shoten's Champion Red between 2003 and 2006.

In October 2007, a live-action television drama adaptation began airing on Tokyo MX, starring Ryouta Murai in the lead role of Kojiro.

Plot

Hakuo Academy used to be a prestigious high school, and famous for martial arts. However, because its rival school Seishikan has been cowardly luring its superior students, Hakuo was going to decline. In order to recover from the situation, the acting principal of Hakuo; Himeko Hojo, sends Ranko Yagyu to the Fuma village in search of the famous Fuma ninja clan for assistance. The leader of the Fuma sent Kojiro to Hakuo, there he faces the notorious Yasha clan who fights for Seishikan led by Musashi Asuka. Kojiro's comrades arrive, resuming an all-out ninja war that began five centuries ago.

Kojiro with his friends, will fight in the "war of the sacred swords", for the conquest of the ten swords that give the power to rule over the whole world.

Characters

Fuma Clan

 Played by Ryouta Murai

 Played by Gaku Shindo

 Played by Yūta Furukawa

 Played by Takehisa Takayama

 Played by Naoya Sakamoto

Voiced by: Shigeru Nakahara
 Played by Kazuya Sakamoto

 Played by Tsuyoshi Takahashi

 Played by Shingo Yashiro

 Played by Hiroki Suzuki

Fuma Leader

Hakuo Academy

 Played by Ayumi

 Played by Makoto Kawahara

Seishikan

 Played by Takuji Kawakubo

 Musashi's younger sister.

 Played by Nonoka Imaizumi

Yasha Clan

 Played by Rei Fujita

 Played by Natsuki Okamoto

8 Yasha Generals

 Played by Yasuka Saitoh

 Played by Haruki Itabashi

 Played by Atsushi Maruyama

 Played by Takuma Harada

 Played by Kōtarō Endō

 Played by Jun Shirota

 Played by Yū Kawada

 Played by Kōji Tashiro

Cosmo Warriors

Chaos Warriors

The Old Fuma Clan

The New Fuma Clan

Others
Witch of the White Mountain

Media

Manga
Fūma no Kojirō is written and illustrated by Masami Kurumada. The manga was published in Shueisha's Weekly Shōnen Jump from January 11, 1982 to November 21, 1983. Shueisha compiled its individual chapters into ten tankōbon volumes, the first published on August 15, 1982 and the last one on May 15, 1984.

In 2003, a sequel entitled Fūma no Kojirō: Yagyū Ansatsuchō started in Akita Shoten's Champion Red on September 19, 2003. The manga is written by Kurumada and illustrated by Satoshi Yuri. The series finished on May 19, 2006. Akita Shoten compiled the individual chapters into three tankōbon volumes released between July 29, 2004 and May 18, 2006.

A new short series entitled Fūma no Kojirō: Jo no Maki was released on Champion Red on August 19, 2019.

Original video animations
A twelve-episode OVA series was produced by Animate Film and J.C. Staff. It was split in two arcs of six episodes each. The first arc was released between June 1 and August 2, 1989. The second arc was released between September 21 and December 1, 1990. An additional one-episode OVA was released on November 21, 1992.

Episode list

Drama
A thirteen-episode live-action television drama series adaptation was announced in July 2007. It was broadcast from October to December 2007. The opening theme is "Ryūsei Rocket" performed by An Cafe and the ending theme is  performed by On/Off.

References

External links
Fuuma-Kojirou.com - Official site of drama adaptation
 

1982 manga
1989 anime OVAs
1990 anime OVAs
1992 anime films
Akita Shoten manga
J.C.Staff
Japanese television dramas based on manga
Masami Kurumada
Ninja in anime and manga
Seinen manga
Shōnen manga
Shueisha manga
Tokusatsu television series
Tokyo MX original programming